José Alejandro Rivas Gamboa (born 13 September 1998) is a Venezuelan professional footballer who plays as a midfielder for Academia Puerto Cabello.

Career statistics

Club

Notes

References

1998 births
Living people
Venezuelan footballers
Association football midfielders
Trujillanos FC players
Estudiantes de Mérida players
Venezuelan Primera División players
People from Valera
21st-century Venezuelan people